The men's 400 metres event at the 1986 European Athletics Championships was held in Stuttgart, then West Germany, at Neckarstadion on 27, 28, and 29 August 1986.

Medalists

Results

Final
29 August

Semi-finals
28 August

Semi-final 1

Semi-final 2

Heats
27 August

Heat 1

Heat 2

Heat 3

Heat 4

Participation
According to an unofficial count, 25 athletes from 13 countries participated in the event.

 (2)
 (2)
 (1)
 (2)
 (2)
 (1)
 (3)
 (2)
 (1)
 (1)
 (3)
 (3)
 (2)

References

400 metres
400 metres at the European Athletics Championships